The Cretaceous is a geological period that lasted from about 145 to 66 million years ago (Mya). It is the third and final period of the Mesozoic Era, as well as the longest. At around 79 million years, it is the longest geological period of the entire Phanerozoic. The name is derived from the Latin creta, "chalk", which is abundant in the latter half of the period. It is usually abbreviated K, for its German translation Kreide.

The Cretaceous was a period with a relatively warm climate, resulting in high eustatic sea levels that created numerous shallow inland seas. These oceans and seas were populated with now-extinct marine reptiles, ammonites, and rudists, while dinosaurs continued to dominate on land. The world was ice free, and forests extended to the poles. During this time, new groups of mammals and birds appeared. During the Early Cretaceous, flowering plants appeared and began to rapidly diversify, becoming the dominant group of plants across the Earth by the end of the Cretaceous, coincident with the decline and extinction of previously widespread gymnosperm groups.

The Cretaceous (along with the Mesozoic) ended with the Cretaceous–Paleogene extinction event, a large mass extinction in which many groups, including non-avian dinosaurs, pterosaurs, and large marine reptiles, died out. The end of the Cretaceous is defined by the abrupt Cretaceous–Paleogene boundary (K–Pg boundary), a geologic signature associated with the mass extinction that  lies between the Mesozoic and Cenozoic Eras.

Etymology and history
The Cretaceous as a separate period was first defined by Belgian geologist Jean d'Omalius d'Halloy in 1822 as the Terrain Crétacé, using strata in the Paris Basin and named for the extensive beds of chalk (calcium carbonate deposited by the shells of marine invertebrates, principally coccoliths), found in the upper Cretaceous of Western Europe. The name Cretaceous was derived from Latin creta, meaning chalk. The twofold division of the Cretaceous was implemented by Conybeare and Phillips in 1822. Alcide d'Orbigny in 1840 divided the French Cretaceous into five étages (stages): the Neocomian, Aptian, Albian, Turonian, and Senonian, later adding the Urgonian between Neocomian and Aptian and the Cenomanian between the Albian and Turonian.

Geology

Subdivisions

The Cretaceous is divided into Early and Late Cretaceous epochs, or Lower and Upper Cretaceous series. In older literature, the Cretaceous is sometimes divided into three series: Neocomian (lower/early), Gallic (middle) and Senonian (upper/late). A subdivision into 12 stages, all originating from European stratigraphy, is now used worldwide. In many parts of the world, alternative local subdivisions are still in use.

From youngest to oldest, the subdivisions of the Cretaceous period are:

Boundaries

The lower boundary of the Cretaceous is currently undefined, and the Jurassic–Cretaceous boundary is currently the only system boundary to lack a defined Global Boundary Stratotype Section and Point (GSSP). Placing a GSSP for this boundary has been difficult because of the strong regionality of most biostratigraphic markers, and the lack of any chemostratigraphic events, such as isotope excursions (large sudden changes in ratios of isotopes) that could be used to define or correlate a boundary. Calpionellids, an enigmatic group of planktonic protists with urn-shaped calcitic tests briefly abundant during the latest Jurassic to earliest Cretaceous, have been suggested as the most promising candidates for fixing the Jurassic–Cretaceous boundary. In particular, the first appearance Calpionella alpina, coinciding with the base of the eponymous Alpina subzone, has been proposed as the definition of the base of the Cretaceous. The working definition for the boundary has often been placed as the first appearance of the ammonite Strambergella jacobi, formerly placed in the genus Berriasella, but its use as a stratigraphic indicator has been questioned, as its first appearance does not correlate with that of C. alpina. The boundary is officially considered by the International Commission on Stratigraphy to be approximately 145 million years ago, but other estimates have been proposed based on U-Pb geochronology, ranging as young as 140 million years ago.

The upper boundary of the Cretaceous is sharply defined, being placed at an iridium-rich layer found worldwide that is believed to be associated with the Chicxulub impact crater, with its boundaries circumscribing parts of the Yucatán Peninsula and extending into the Gulf of Mexico. This layer has been dated at 66.043 Mya.

At the end of the Cretaceous, the impact of a large body with the Earth may have been the punctuation mark at the end of a progressive decline in biodiversity during the Maastrichtian age. The result was the extinction of three-quarters of Earth's plant and animal species. The impact created the sharp break known as the K–Pg boundary (formerly known as the K–T boundary). Earth's biodiversity required substantial time to recover from this event, despite the probable existence of an abundance of vacant ecological niches.

Despite the severity of the K-Pg extinction event, there were significant variations in the rate of extinction between and within different clades. Species that depended on photosynthesis declined or became extinct as atmospheric particles blocked solar energy. As is the case today, photosynthesizing organisms, such as phytoplankton and land plants, formed the primary part of the food chain in the late Cretaceous, and all else that depended on them suffered, as well. Herbivorous animals, which depended on plants and plankton as their food, died out as their food sources became scarce; consequently, the top predators, such as Tyrannosaurus rex, also perished. Yet only three major groups of tetrapods disappeared completely; the nonavian dinosaurs, the plesiosaurs and the pterosaurs. The other Cretaceous groups that did not survive into the Cenozoic the ichthyosaurs, last remaining temnospondyls (Koolasuchus), and nonmammalian  were already extinct millions of years before the event occurred.

Coccolithophorids and molluscs, including ammonites, rudists, freshwater snails, and mussels, as well as organisms whose food chain included these shell builders, became extinct or suffered heavy losses. For example, ammonites are thought to have been the principal food of mosasaurs, a group of giant marine lizards related to snakes that became extinct at the boundary.

Omnivores, insectivores, and carrion-eaters survived the extinction event, perhaps because of the increased availability of their food sources. At the end of the Cretaceous, there seem to have been no purely herbivorous or carnivorous mammals. Mammals and birds that survived the extinction fed on insects, larvae, worms, and snails, which in turn fed on dead plant and animal matter. Scientists theorise that these organisms survived the collapse of plant-based food chains because they fed on detritus.

In stream communities, few groups of animals became extinct. Stream communities rely less on food from living plants and more on detritus that washes in from land. This particular ecological niche buffered them from extinction. Similar, but more complex patterns have been found in the oceans. Extinction was more severe among animals living in the water column than among animals living on or in the seafloor. Animals in the water column are almost entirely dependent on primary production from living phytoplankton, while animals living on or in the ocean floor feed on detritus or can switch to detritus feeding.

The largest air-breathing survivors of the event, crocodilians and champsosaurs, were semiaquatic and had access to detritus. Modern crocodilians can live as scavengers and can survive for months without food and go into hibernation when conditions are unfavorable, and their young are small, grow slowly, and feed largely on invertebrates and dead organisms or fragments of organisms for their first few years. These characteristics have been linked to crocodilian survival at the end of the Cretaceous.

Geologic formations 

The high sea level and warm climate of the Cretaceous meant large areas of the continents were covered by warm, shallow seas, providing habitat for many marine organisms. The Cretaceous was named for the extensive chalk deposits of this age in Europe, but in many parts of the world, the deposits from the Cretaceous are of marine limestone, a rock type that is formed under warm, shallow marine conditions. Due to the high sea level, there was extensive space for such sedimentation. Because of the relatively young age and great thickness of the system, Cretaceous rocks are evident in many areas worldwide.

Chalk is a rock type characteristic for (but not restricted to) the Cretaceous. It consists of coccoliths, microscopically small calcite skeletons of coccolithophores, a type of algae that prospered in the Cretaceous seas.

Stagnation of deep sea currents in middle Cretaceous times caused anoxic conditions in the sea water leaving the deposited organic matter undecomposed. Half of the world's petroleum reserves were laid down at this time in the anoxic conditions of what would become the Persian Gulf and the Gulf of Mexico. In many places around the world, dark anoxic shales were formed during this interval, such as the Mancos Shale of western North America. These shales are an important source rock for oil and gas, for example in the subsurface of the North Sea.

Europe 

In northwestern Europe, chalk deposits from the Upper Cretaceous are characteristic for the Chalk Group, which forms the white cliffs of Dover on the south coast of England and similar cliffs on the French Normandian coast. The group is found in England, northern France, the low countries, northern Germany, Denmark and in the subsurface of the southern part of the North Sea. Chalk is not easily consolidated and the Chalk Group still consists of loose sediments in many places. The group also has other limestones and arenites. Among the fossils it contains are sea urchins, belemnites, ammonites and sea reptiles such as Mosasaurus.

In southern Europe, the Cretaceous is usually a marine system consisting of competent limestone beds or incompetent marls. Because the Alpine mountain chains did not yet exist in the Cretaceous, these deposits formed on the southern edge of the European continental shelf, at the margin of the Tethys Ocean.

North America 

During the Cretaceous, the present North American continent was isolated from the other continents. In the Jurassic, the North Atlantic already opened, leaving a proto-ocean between Europe and North America. From north to south across the continent, the Western Interior Seaway started forming. This inland sea separated the elevated areas of Laramidia in the west and Appalachia in the east. Three dinosaur clades found in Laramidia (troodontids, therizinosaurids and oviraptorosaurs) are absent from Appalachia from the Coniacian through the Maastrichtian.

Paleogeography 
During the Cretaceous, the late-Paleozoic-to-early-Mesozoic supercontinent of Pangaea completed its tectonic breakup into the present-day continents, although their positions were substantially different at the time. As the Atlantic Ocean widened, the convergent-margin mountain building (orogenies) that had begun during the Jurassic continued in the North American Cordillera, as the Nevadan orogeny was followed by the Sevier and Laramide orogenies.

Gondwana had begun to break up during the Jurassic Period, but its fragmentation accelerated during the Cretaceous and was largely complete by the end of the period. South America, Antarctica, and Australia rifted away from Africa (though India and Madagascar remained attached to each other until around 80 million years ago); thus, the South Atlantic and Indian Oceans were newly formed. Such active rifting lifted great undersea mountain chains along the welts, raising eustatic sea levels worldwide. To the north of Africa the Tethys Sea continued to narrow. During the most of the Late Cretaceous, North America would be divided in two by the Western Interior Seaway, a large interior sea, separating Laramidia to the west and Appalachia to the east, then receded late in the period, leaving thick marine deposits sandwiched between coal beds. Bivalve palaeobiogeography also indicates that Africa was split in half by a shallow sea during the Coniacian and Santonian, connecting the Tethys with the South Atlantic by way of the central Sahara and Central Africa, which were then underwater. At the peak of the Cretaceous transgression, one-third of Earth's present land area was submerged.

The Cretaceous is justly famous for its chalk; indeed, more chalk formed in the Cretaceous than in any other period in the Phanerozoic. Mid-ocean ridge activity—or rather, the circulation of seawater through the enlarged ridges—enriched the oceans in calcium; this made the oceans more saturated, as well as increased the bioavailability of the element for calcareous nanoplankton. These widespread carbonates and other sedimentary deposits make the Cretaceous rock record especially fine. Famous formations from North America include the rich marine fossils of Kansas's Smoky Hill Chalk Member and the terrestrial fauna of the late Cretaceous Hell Creek Formation. Other important Cretaceous exposures occur in Europe (e.g., the Weald) and China (the Yixian Formation). In the area that is now India, massive lava beds called the Deccan Traps were erupted in the very late Cretaceous and early Paleocene.

Climate

Palynological evidence indicates the Cretaceous climate had three broad phases: a Berriasian–Barremian warm-dry phase, a Aptian–Santonian warm-wet phase, and a Campanian–Maastrichtian cool-dry phase. 

The cooling trend of the last epoch of the Jurassic, the Tithonian, continued into the Berriasian, the first age of the Cretaceous. There is evidence that snowfalls were common in the higher latitudes during this age, and the tropics became wetter than during the Triassic and Jurassic. Glaciation was restricted to high-latitude mountains, though seasonal snow may have existed farther from the poles. After the end of the first age, however, temperatures began to increase again, with a number of thermal excursions, such as the middle Valanginian Weissert Thermal Excursion (WTX), the middle Hauterivian Faraoni Thermal Excursion (FTX), and the early Barremian Hauptblatterton Thermal Event (HTE) occurring. The HTE marked the ultimate end of the Tithonian-early Barremian Cool Interval (TEBCI). The TEBCI was followed by the Barremian-Aptian Warm Interval (BAWI), which itself was followed by the Aptian-Albian Cold Snap (AACS) that began about 118 million years ago. A short, relatively minor ice age may have occurred during this so-called "cold snap", as evidenced by glacial dropstones in the western parts of the Tethys Ocean. The AACS ended around 111 million years ago with the Paquier/Urbino Thermal Maximum, giving way to the Mid-Cretaceous Hothouse (MKH), which lasted from the early Albian until the early Campanian.

The MKH was punctuated by multiple thermal maxima of extreme warmth comparable to and possibly exceeding the better known Palaeocene-Eocene Thermal Maximum in magnitude, including the Amadeus Thermal Maximum around 106 million years ago, the Breistroffer Thermal Maximum around 101 million years ago, the Cenomanian-Turonian Thermal Maximum around 94 million years ago, and the Coniacian Thermal Maximum around 87 million years ago. Such hot temperatures during the MKH resulted in a very gentle temperature gradient from the equator to the poles; the latitudinal temperature gradient during the Cenomanian-Turonian Thermal Maximum was 0.54 °C per ° latitude for the Southern Hemisphere and 0.49 °C per ° latitude for the Northern Hemisphere, in contrast to present day values of 1.07 and 0.69 °C per ° latitude for the Southern and Northern hemispheres, respectively. This meant weaker global winds, which drive the ocean currents, and resulted in less upwelling and more stagnant oceans than today. This is evidenced by widespread black shale deposition and frequent anoxic events. Meanwhile, deep ocean temperatures were as much as  warmer than today's; one study estimated that deep ocean temperatures were between 12 and 20 °C during the MKH. 

Beginning in the Santonian, near the end of the MKH, the global climate began to cool, with this cooling trend continuing across the Campanian. This period of cooling, driven by falling levels of atmospheric carbon dioxide, caused the end of the MKH and the transition into a cooler climatic interval, known formally as the Late Cretaceous-Early Palaeogene Cool Interval (LKEPCI). Deep ocean temperatures declined to 9 to 12 °C, though the shallow temperature gradient between tropical and polar seas remained. Regional conditions in the Western Interior Seaway changed little between the MKH and the LKEPCI. Two upticks in global temperatures are known to have occurred during the Maastrichtian, bucking the trend of overall cooler temperatures during the LKEPCI. Atmospheric CO2 and temperature relations indicate a doubling of pCO2 was accompanied by a ~0.6 °C increase in temperature. The LKEPCI lasted into the Late Palaeocene, when it gave way to another supergreenhouse interval.

The production of large quantities of magma, variously attributed to mantle plumes or to extensional tectonics, further pushed sea levels up, so that large areas of the continental crust were covered with shallow seas. The Tethys Sea connecting the tropical oceans east to west also helped to warm the global climate. Warm-adapted plant fossils are known from localities as far north as Alaska and Greenland, while dinosaur fossils have been found within 15 degrees of the Cretaceous south pole. It was suggested that there was Antarctic marine glaciation in the Turonian Age, based on isotopic evidence. However, this has subsequently been suggested to be the result of inconsistent isotopic proxies, with evidence of polar rainforests during this time interval at 82° S. Rafting by ice of stones into marine environments occurred during much of the Cretaceous, but evidence of deposition directly from glaciers is limited to the Early Cretaceous of the Eromanga Basin in southern Australia.

Flora 

Flowering plants (angiosperms) make up around 90% of living plant species today. Prior to the rise of angiosperms, during the Jurassic and the Early Cretaceous, the higher flora was dominated by gymnosperm groups, including cycads, conifers, ginkgophytes, gnetophytes and close relatives, as well as the extinct Bennettitales. Other groups of plants included pteridosperms or "seed ferns", a collective term that refers to disparate groups of extinct seed plants with fern-like foliage, including groups such as Corystospermaceae and Caytoniales. The exact origins of angiosperms are uncertain, although molecular evidence suggests that they are not closely related to any living group of gymnosperms.

The earliest widely accepted evidence of flowering plants are monosulcate (single-grooved) pollen grains from the late Valanginian (~ 134 million years ago) found in Israel and Italy, initially at low abundance. Molecular clock estimates conflict with fossil estimates, suggesting the diversification of crown-group angiosperms during the Upper Triassic or Jurassic, but such estimates are difficult to reconcile with the heavily sampled pollen record and the distinctive tricolpate to tricolporoidate (triple grooved) pollen of eudicot angiosperms. Among the oldest records of Angiosperm macrofossils are Montsechia from the Barremian aged Las Hoyas beds of Spain and Archaefructus from the Barremian-Aptian boundary Yixian Formation in China. Tricolpate pollen distinctive of eudicots first appears in the Late Barremian, while the earliest remains of monocots are known from the Aptian. Flowering plants underwent a rapid radiation beginning during the middle Cretaceous, becoming the dominant group of land plants by the end of the period, coincident with the decline of previously dominant groups such as conifers. The oldest known fossils of grasses are from the Albian, with the family having diversified into modern groups by the end of the Cretaceous.

During the Cretaceous, Polypodiales ferns, which make up 80% of living fern species, would also begin to diversify.

Terrestrial fauna
On land, mammals were generally small sized, but a very relevant component of the fauna, with cimolodont multituberculates outnumbering dinosaurs in some sites. Neither true marsupials nor placentals existed until the very end, but a variety of non-marsupial metatherians and non-placental eutherians had already begun to diversify greatly, ranging as carnivores (Deltatheroida), aquatic foragers (Stagodontidae) and herbivores (Schowalteria, Zhelestidae). Various "archaic" groups like eutriconodonts were common in the Early Cretaceous, but by the Late Cretaceous northern mammalian faunas were dominated by multituberculates and therians, with dryolestoids dominating South America.

The apex predators were archosaurian reptiles, especially dinosaurs, which were at their most diverse stage. Avians such as the ancestors of modern-day birds also diversified. They inhabited every continent, and were even found in cold polar latitudes. Pterosaurs were common in the early and middle Cretaceous, but as the Cretaceous proceeded they declined for poorly understood reasons (once thought to be due to competition with early birds, but now it is understood avian adaptive radiation is not consistent with pterosaur decline). By the end of the period only three highly specialized families remained; Pteranodontidae, Nyctosauridae, and Azhdarchidae.

The Liaoning lagerstätte (Yixian Formation) in China is an important site, full of preserved remains of numerous types of small dinosaurs, birds and mammals, that provides a glimpse of life in the Early Cretaceous. The coelurosaur dinosaurs found there represent types of the group Maniraptora, which includes modern birds and their closest non-avian relatives, such as dromaeosaurs, oviraptorosaurs, therizinosaurs, troodontids along with other avialans. Fossils of these dinosaurs from the Liaoning lagerstätte are notable for the presence of hair-like feathers.

Insects diversified during the Cretaceous, and the oldest known ants, termites and some lepidopterans, akin to butterflies and moths, appeared. Aphids, grasshoppers and gall wasps appeared.

Rhynchocephalians 

Rhynchocephalians (which today only includes the Tuatara) disappeared from North America and Europe after the Early Cretaceous, and were absent from North Africa and northern South America by the early Late Cretaceous. The cause of the decline of Rhynchocephalia remains unclear, but has often been suggested to be due to competition with advanced lizards and mammals. They appear to have remained diverse in high-latitude southern South America during the Late Cretaceous, where lizards remained rare, with their remains outnumbering terrestrial lizards 200:1.

Choristodera 

Choristoderes, a group of freshwater aquatic reptiles that first appeared during the preceding Jurassic, underwent a major evolutionary radiation in Asia during the Early Cretaceous, which represents the high point of choristoderan diversity, including long necked forms such as Hyphalosaurus and the first records of the gharial-like Neochoristodera, which appear to have evolved in the regional absence of aquatic neosuchian crocodyliformes. During the Late Cretaceous the neochoristodere Champsosaurus was widely distributed across western North America.

Marine fauna
In the seas, rays, modern sharks and teleosts became common. Marine reptiles included ichthyosaurs in the early and mid-Cretaceous (becoming extinct during the late Cretaceous Cenomanian-Turonian anoxic event), plesiosaurs throughout the entire period, and mosasaurs appearing in the Late Cretaceous. Sea turtles in the form of Cheloniidae and Panchelonioidea lived during the period and survived the extinction event. Panchelonioidea is today represented by a single species; the leatherback sea turtle.

Baculites, an ammonite genus with a straight shell, flourished in the seas along with reef-building rudist clams. The Hesperornithiformes were flightless, marine diving birds that swam like grebes. Globotruncanid Foraminifera and echinoderms such as sea urchins and starfish (sea stars) thrived. Thylacocephala, a class of crustaceans, went extinct in the Late Cretaceous. The first radiation of the diatoms (generally siliceous shelled, rather than calcareous) in the oceans occurred during the Cretaceous; freshwater diatoms did not appear until the Miocene. The Cretaceous was also an important interval in the evolution of bioerosion, the production of borings and scrapings in rocks, hardgrounds and shells.

See also

 Mesozoic Era
 Cretaceous-Paleogene extinction
 Chalk Group
 Cretaceous Thermal Maximum
 List of fossil sites (with link directory)
 South Polar region of the Cretaceous

References

Citations

Bibliography
 
 
 
 
 —detailed coverage of various aspects of the evolutionary history of the insects.

External links 

UCMP Berkeley Cretaceous page
Cretaceous Microfossils: 180+ images of Foraminifera
Cretaceous (chronostratigraphy scale)

 
Geological periods